Eleventh Fleet or 11th fleet may refer to:

 United States Eleventh Fleet
 11th Air Fleet (Imperial Japanese Navy)

See also
 
 
 
 
 Eleventh (disambiguation)
 Fleet (disambiguation)
 Tenth Fleet (disambiguation)
 Twelfth Fleet (disambiguation)